Research is "creative and systematic work undertaken to increase the stock of knowledge". It involves the collection, organization and analysis of evidence to increase understanding of a topic, characterized by a particular attentiveness to controlling sources of bias and error.  These activities are characterized by accounting and controlling for biases. A research project may be an expansion on past work in the field. To test the validity of instruments, procedures, or experiments, research may replicate elements of prior projects or the project as a whole.

The primary purposes of basic research (as opposed to applied research) are documentation, discovery, interpretation, and the research and development (R&D) of methods and systems for the advancement of human knowledge. Approaches to research depend on epistemologies, which vary considerably both within and between humanities and sciences. There are several forms of research: scientific, humanities, artistic, economic, social, business, marketing, practitioner research, life, technological, etc. The scientific study of research practices is known as meta-research.

A researcher is a person engaged in conducting research, possibly recognized as an occupation by a formal job title. Researchers are either Social Scientist or Natural Science Scientist. In order to be social researcher or social scientist, one should have enormous knowledge of subject related to social science that they are specialized in. Similarly, in order to be natural science researcher, the person should have knowledge on field related to natural science (Physics, Chemistry, Biology, Astronomy, Zoology and so on).

Etymology 

The word research is derived from the Middle French "recherche", which means "to go about seeking", the term itself being derived from the Old French term "recerchier" a compound word from "re-" + "cerchier", or "sercher", meaning 'search'. The earliest recorded use of the term was in 1577.

Definitions 
Research has been defined in a number of different ways, and while there are similarities, there does not appear to be a single, all-encompassing definition that is embraced by all who engage in it.

Research in simplest terms is searching for knowledge and searching for truth. In a formal sense, it is a systematic study of a problem attacked by a deliberately chosen strategy which starts with choosing an approach to preparing a blueprint (design) and acting upon it in terms of designing research hypotheses, choosing methods and techniques, selecting or developing data collection tools, processing the data, interpretation and ends with presenting solution/s of the problem.

Another definition of research is given by John W. Creswell, who states that "research is a process of steps used to collect and analyze information to increase our understanding of a topic or issue". It consists of three steps: pose a question, collect data to answer the question, and present an answer to the question.

The Merriam-Webster Online Dictionary defines research in more detail as "studious inquiry or examination; especially: investigation or experimentation aimed at the discovery and interpretation of facts, revision of accepted theories or laws in the light of new facts, or practical application of such new or revised theories or laws"

Forms of research

Original research 

Original research, also called primary research, is research that is not exclusively based on a summary, review, or synthesis of earlier publications on the subject of research. This material is of a primary-source character. The purpose of the original research is to produce new knowledge, rather than to present the existing knowledge in a new form (e.g., summarized or classified). Original research can be in various forms, depending on the discipline it pertains to. In experimental work, it typically involves direct or indirect observation of the researched subject(s), e.g., in the laboratory or in the field, documents the methodology, results, and conclusions of an experiment or set of experiments, or offers a novel interpretation of previous results. In analytical work, there are typically some new (for example) mathematical results produced, or a new way of approaching an existing problem. In some subjects which do not typically carry out experimentation or analysis of this kind, the originality is in the particular way existing understanding is changed or re-interpreted based on the outcome of the work of the researcher.

The degree of originality of the research is among major criteria for articles to be published in academic journals and usually established by means of peer review. Graduate students are commonly required to perform original research as part of a dissertation.

Scientific research 

Scientific research is a systematic way of gathering data and harnessing curiosity. This research provides scientific information and theories for the explanation of the nature and the properties of the world. It makes practical applications possible. Scientific research is funded by public authorities, by charitable organizations and by private groups, including many companies. Scientific research can be subdivided into different classifications according to their academic and application disciplines. Scientific research is a widely used criterion for judging the standing of an academic institution, but some argue that such is an inaccurate assessment of the institution, because the quality of research does not tell about the quality of teaching (these do not necessarily correlate).

Generally, research is understood to follow a certain structural process. Though step order may vary depending on the subject matter and researcher, the following steps are usually part of most formal research, both basic and applied:
 Observations and formation of the topic: Consists of the subject area of one's interest and following that subject area to conduct subject-related research. The subject area should not be randomly chosen since it requires reading a vast amount of literature on the topic to determine the gap in the literature the researcher intends to narrow. A keen interest in the chosen subject area is advisable. The research will have to be justified by linking its importance to already existing knowledge about the topic.
 Hypothesis: A testable prediction which designates the relationship between two or more variables.
 Conceptual definition: Description of a concept by relating it to other concepts.
 Operational definition: Details in regards to defining the variables and how they will be measured/assessed in the study.
 Gathering of data: Consists of identifying a population and selecting samples, gathering information from or about these samples by using specific research instruments. The instruments used for data collection must be valid and reliable.
 Analysis of data: Involves breaking down the individual pieces of data to draw conclusions about it.
 Data Interpretation: This can be represented through tables, figures, and pictures, and then described in words.
 Test, revising of hypothesis
 Conclusion, reiteration if necessary

A common misconception is that a hypothesis will be proven (see, rather, null hypothesis). Generally, a hypothesis is used to make predictions that can be tested by observing the outcome of an experiment. If the outcome is inconsistent with the hypothesis, then the hypothesis is rejected (see falsifiability). However, if the outcome is consistent with the hypothesis, the experiment is said to support the hypothesis. This careful language is used because researchers recognize that alternative hypotheses may also be consistent with the observations. In this sense, a hypothesis can never be proven, but rather only supported by surviving rounds of scientific testing and, eventually, becoming widely thought of as true.

A useful hypothesis allows prediction and within the accuracy of observation of the time, the prediction will be verified. As the accuracy of observation improves with time, the hypothesis may no longer provide an accurate prediction. In this case, a new hypothesis will arise to challenge the old, and to the extent that the new hypothesis makes more accurate predictions than the old, the new will supplant it. Researchers can also use a null hypothesis, which states no relationship or difference between the independent or dependent variables.

Research in the humanities 
Research in the humanities involves different methods such as for example hermeneutics and semiotics. Humanities scholars usually do not search for the ultimate correct answer to a question, but instead, explore the issues and details that surround it. Context is always important, and context can be social, historical, political, cultural, or ethnic. An example of research in the humanities is historical research, which is embodied in historical method. Historians use primary sources and other evidence to systematically investigate a topic, and then to write histories in the form of accounts of the past. Other studies aim to merely examine the occurrence of behaviours in societies and communities, without particularly looking for reasons or motivations to explain these. These studies may be qualitative or quantitative, and can use a variety of approaches, such as queer theory or feminist theory.

Artistic research 
Artistic research, also seen as 'practice-based research', can take form when creative works are considered both the research and the object of research itself. It is the debatable body of thought which offers an alternative to purely scientific methods in research in its search for knowledge and truth.

The controversial trend of artistic teaching becoming more academics-oriented is leading to artistic research being accepted as the primary mode of enquiry in art as in the case of other disciplines. One of the characteristics of artistic research is that it must accept subjectivity as opposed to the classical scientific methods. As such, it is similar to the social sciences in using qualitative research and intersubjectivity as tools to apply measurement and critical analysis.

Artistic research has been defined by the School of Dance and Circus (Dans och Cirkushögskolan, DOCH), Stockholm in the following manner – "Artistic research is to investigate and test with the purpose of gaining knowledge within and for our artistic disciplines. It is based on artistic practices, methods, and criticality. Through presented documentation, the insights gained shall be placed in a context." Artistic research aims to enhance knowledge and understanding with presentation of the arts. A simpler understanding by Julian Klein defines artistic research as any kind of research employing the artistic mode of perception. For a survey of the central problematics of today's artistic research, see Giaco Schiesser.

According to artist Hakan Topal, in artistic research, "perhaps more so than other disciplines, intuition is utilized as a method to identify a wide range of new and unexpected productive modalities". Most writers, whether of fiction or non-fiction books, also have to do research to support their creative work. This may be factual, historical, or background research. Background research could include, for example, geographical or procedural research.

The Society for Artistic Research (SAR) publishes the triannual Journal for Artistic Research (JAR), an international, online, open access, and peer-reviewed journal for the identification, publication, and dissemination of artistic research and its methodologies, from all arts disciplines and it runs the Research Catalogue (RC), a searchable, documentary database of artistic research, to which anyone can contribute.

Patricia Leavy addresses eight arts-based research (ABR) genres: narrative inquiry, fiction-based research, poetry, music, dance, theatre, film, and visual art.

In 2016, the European League of Institutes of the Arts launched The Florence Principles' on the Doctorate in the Arts. The Florence Principles relating to the Salzburg Principles and the Salzburg Recommendations of the European University Association name seven points of attention to specify the Doctorate / PhD in the Arts compared to a scientific doctorate / PhD. The Florence Principles have been endorsed and are supported also by AEC, CILECT, CUMULUS and SAR.

Historical research 

The historical method comprises the techniques and guidelines by which historians use historical sources and other evidence to research and then to write history. There are various history guidelines that are commonly used by historians in their work, under the headings of external criticism, internal criticism, and synthesis. This includes lower criticism and sensual criticism. Though items may vary depending on the subject matter and researcher, the following concepts are part of most formal historical research:
 Identification of origin date
 Evidence of localization
 Recognition of authorship
 Analysis of data
 Identification of integrity
 Attribution of credibility

Documentary research

Steps in conducting research 

Research is often conducted using the hourglass model structure of research. The hourglass model starts with a broad spectrum for research, focusing in on the required information through the method of the project (like the neck of the hourglass), then expands the research in the form of discussion and results. The major steps in conducting research are:
 Identification of research problem
 Literature review
 Specifying the purpose of research
 Determining specific research questions
 Specification of a conceptual framework, sometimes including a set of hypotheses
 Choice of a methodology (for data collection)
 Data collection
 Verifying data
 Analyzing and interpreting the data
 Reporting and evaluating research
 Communicating the research findings and, possibly, recommendations

The steps generally represent the overall process; however, they should be viewed as an ever-changing iterative process rather than a fixed set of steps. Most research begins with a general statement of the problem, or rather, the purpose for engaging in the study. The literature review identifies flaws or holes in previous research which provides justification for the study. Often, a literature review is conducted in a given subject area before a research question is identified. A gap in the current literature, as identified by a researcher, then engenders a research question. The research question may be parallel to the hypothesis. The hypothesis is the supposition to be tested. The researcher(s) collects data to test the hypothesis. The researcher(s) then analyzes and interprets the data via a variety of statistical methods, engaging in what is known as empirical research. The results of the data analysis in rejecting or failing to reject the null hypothesis are then reported and evaluated. At the end, the researcher may discuss avenues for further research. However, some researchers advocate for the reverse approach: starting with articulating findings and discussion of them, moving "up" to identification of a research problem that emerges in the findings and literature review. The reverse approach is justified by the transactional nature of the research endeavor where research inquiry, research questions, research method, relevant research literature, and so on are not fully known until the findings have fully emerged and been interpreted.

Rudolph Rummel says, "... no researcher should accept any one or two tests as definitive. It is only when a range of tests are consistent over many kinds of data, researchers, and methods can one have confidence in the results."

Plato in Meno talks about an inherent difficulty, if not a paradox, of doing research that can be paraphrased in the following way, "If you know what you're searching for, why do you search for it?! [i.e., you have already found it] If you don't know what you're searching for, what are you searching for?!"

Research methods 

The goal of the research process is to produce new knowledge or deepen understanding of a topic or issue. This process takes three main forms (although, as previously discussed, the boundaries between them may be obscure):
 Exploratory research, which helps to identify and define a problem or question.
 Constructive research, which tests theories and proposes solutions to a problem or question.
 Empirical research, which tests the feasibility of a solution using empirical evidence.
There are two major types of empirical research design: qualitative research and quantitative research. Researchers choose qualitative or quantitative methods according to the nature of the research topic they want to investigate and the research questions they aim to answer:

Qualitative research

Qualitative research refers to much more subjective non- quantitative, use different methods of collecting data, analyzing data, interpreting data for meanings, definitions, characteristics, symbols metaphors of things.Qualitative research further classified into following types: Ethnography: This research mainly focus on culture of group of people which includes share attributes, language, practices, structure, value, norms and material things, evaluate human lifestyle. Ethno: people, Grapho: to write, this disciple may include ethnic groups, ethno genesis, composition, resettlement and social welfare characteristics. Phenomenology: It is very powerful strategy for demonstrating methodology to health professions education as well as best suited for exploring challenging problems in health professions educations.

Quantitative research
This involves systematic empirical investigation of quantitative properties and phenomena and their relationships, by asking a narrow question and collecting numerical data to analyze it utilizing statistical methods. The quantitative research designs are experimental, correlational, and survey (or descriptive). Statistics derived from quantitative research can be used to establish the existence of associative or causal relationships between variables. Quantitative research is linked with the philosophical and theoretical stance of positivism.

The quantitative data collection methods rely on random sampling and structured data collection instruments that fit diverse experiences into predetermined response categories. These methods produce results that can be summarized, compared, and generalized to larger populations if the data are collected using proper sampling and data collection strategies. Quantitative research is concerned with testing hypotheses derived from theory or being able to estimate the size of a phenomenon of interest.

If the research question is about people, participants may be randomly assigned to different treatments (this is the only way that a quantitative study can be considered a true experiment). If this is not feasible, the researcher may collect data on participant and situational characteristics to statistically control for their influence on the dependent, or outcome, variable. If the intent is to generalize from the research participants to a larger population, the researcher will employ probability sampling to select participants.

In either qualitative or quantitative research, the researcher(s) may collect primary or secondary data. Primary data is data collected specifically for the research, such as through interviews or questionnaires. Secondary data is data that already exists, such as census data, which can be re-used for the research. It is good ethical research practice to use secondary data wherever possible.

Mixed-method research, i.e. research that includes qualitative and quantitative elements, using both primary and secondary data, is becoming more common. This method has benefits that using one method alone cannot offer. For example, a researcher may choose to conduct a qualitative study and follow it up with a quantitative study to gain additional insights.

Big data has brought big impacts on research methods so that now many researchers do not put much effort into data collection; furthermore, methods to analyze easily available huge amounts of data have also been developed.
Types of Research Method
1. Observatory Research Method
2. Correlation Research Method 

Non-empirical research
Non-empirical (theoretical) research is an approach that involves the development of theory as opposed to using observation and experimentation. As such, non-empirical research seeks solutions to problems using existing knowledge as its source. This, however, does not mean that new ideas and innovations cannot be found within the pool of existing and established knowledge. Non-empirical research is not an absolute alternative to empirical research because they may be used together to strengthen a research approach. Neither one is less effective than the other since they have their particular purpose in science. Typically empirical research produces observations that need to be explained; then theoretical research tries to explain them, and in so doing generates empirically testable hypotheses; these hypotheses are then tested empirically, giving more observations that may need further explanation; and so on. See Scientific method.

A simple example of a non-empirical task is the prototyping of a new drug using a differentiated application of existing knowledge; another is the development of a business process in the form of a flow chart and texts where all the ingredients are from established knowledge. Much of cosmological research is theoretical in nature. Mathematics research does not rely on externally available data; rather, it seeks to prove theorems about mathematical objects.

Research ethics 

Research ethics is concerned with the moral issues that arise during or as a result of research activities, as well as the conduct of individual researchers, and the implications for research communities. Historically, scandals such as Nazi human experimentation and the Tuskegee syphilis experiment led to the realisation that clear measures are needed for the ethical governance of research to ensure that people, animals and environments are not unduly harmed by scientific inquiry. The management of research ethics is inconsistent across countries and there is no universally accepted approach to how it should be addressed. Research ethics committees (Institutional review board in the US) have emerged as one governance mechanism to ensure research is conducted responsibly.

When making moral judgments, we may be guided by different values. Philosophers commonly distinguish between approaches like deontology, consequentialism, Confucianism, virtue ethics, and Ubuntu ethics, to list a few. Regardless of approach, the application of ethical theory to specific contexts is known as applied ethics, and research ethics can be viewed as a subfield of applied ethics because ethical theory is applied in real-world research scenarios.

Ethical issues may arise in the design and implementation of research involving human experimentation or animal experimentation. There may also be consequences for the environment, for society or for future generations that need to be considered. Research ethics is most developed as a concept in medical research, with typically cited codes being the 1947 Nuremberg Code, the 1964 Declaration of Helsinki, and the 1978 Belmont Report. Informed consent is a key concept in research ethics thanks to these codes. Research in other fields such as social sciences, information technology, biotechnology, or engineering may generate different types of ethical concerns to those in medical research.

In countries such as Canada, mandatory research ethics training is required for students, professors and others who work in research, whilst the US has legislated on how institutional review boards operate since the 1974 National Research Act.

Research ethics is commonly distinguished from the promotion of academic or research integrity, which includes issues such as scientific misconduct (e.g. fraud, fabrication of data or plagiarism). Note that because of the close interaction with integrity, increasingly research ethics is included as part of the broader field of responsible conduct of research (RCR in North America) or Responsible Research and Innovation in Europe, and with government agencies such as the United States Office of Research Integrity or the Canadian Interagency Advisory Panel on Responsible Conduct of Research promoting or requiring interdisciplinary training for researchers.

Problems in research

Meta-research 

Meta-research is the study of research through the use of research methods. Also known as "research on research", it aims to reduce waste and increase the quality of research in all fields. Meta-research concerns itself with the detection of bias, methodological flaws, and other errors and inefficiencies. Among the finding of meta-research is a low rates of reproducibility across a large number of fields. This widespread difficulty in reproducing research has been termed the "replication crisis."

Methods of research 
In many disciplines, Western methods of conducting research are predominant. Researchers are overwhelmingly taught Western methods of data collection and study. The increasing participation of indigenous peoples as researchers has brought increased attention to the scientific lacuna in culturally sensitive methods of data collection. Western methods of data collection may not be the most accurate or relevant for research on non-Western societies. For example, "Hua Oranga" was created as a criterion for psychological evaluation in Māori populations, and is based on dimensions of mental health important to the Māori people – "taha wairua (the spiritual dimension), taha hinengaro (the mental dimension), taha tinana (the physical dimension), and taha whanau (the family dimension)".

Bias 
Research is often biased in the languages that are preferred (linguicism) and the geographic locations where research occurs.
Periphery scholars face the challenges of exclusion and linguicism in research and academic publication. As the great majority of mainstream academic journals are written in English, multilingual periphery scholars often must translate their work to be accepted to elite Western-dominated journals. Multilingual scholars' influences from their native communicative styles can be assumed to be incompetence instead of difference.

For comparative politics, Western countries are over-represented in single-country studies, with heavy emphasis on Western Europe, Canada, Australia, and New Zealand. Since 2000, Latin American countries have become more popular in single-country studies. In contrast, countries in Oceania and the Caribbean are the focus of very few studies. Patterns of geographic bias also show a relationship with linguicism: countries whose official languages are French or Arabic are far less likely to be the focus of single-country studies than countries with different official languages. Within Africa, English-speaking countries are more represented than other countries.

Generalizability

Generalization is the process of more broadly applying the valid results of one study. Studies with a narrow scope can result in a lack of generalizability, meaning that the results may not be applicable to other populations or regions. In comparative politics, this can result from using a single-country study, rather than a study design that uses data from multiple countries. Despite the issue of generalizability, single-country studies have risen in prevalence since the late 2000s.

Publication peer review 

Peer review is a form of self-regulation by qualified members of a profession within the relevant field. Peer review methods are employed to maintain standards of quality, improve performance, and provide credibility. In academia, scholarly peer review is often used to determine an academic paper's suitability for publication. Usually, the peer review process involves experts in the same field who are consulted by editors to give a review of the scholarly works produced by a colleague of theirs from an unbiased and impartial point of view, and this is usually done free of charge. The tradition of peer reviews being done for free has however brought many pitfalls which are also indicative of why most peer reviewers decline many invitations to review. It was observed that publications from periphery countries rarely rise to the same elite status as those of North America and Europe, because limitations on the availability of resources including high-quality paper and sophisticated image-rendering software and printing tools render these publications less able to satisfy standards currently carrying formal or informal authority in the publishing industry. These limitations in turn result in the under-representation of scholars from periphery nations among the set of publications holding prestige status relative to the quantity and quality of those scholars' research efforts, and this under-representation in turn results in disproportionately reduced acceptance of the results of their efforts as contributions to the body of knowledge available worldwide.

Influence of the open-access movement 
The open access movement assumes that all information generally deemed useful should be free and belongs to a "public domain", that of "humanity". This idea gained prevalence as a result of Western colonial history and ignores alternative conceptions of knowledge circulation. For instance, most indigenous communities consider that access to certain information proper to the group should be determined by relationships.

There is alleged to be a double standard in the Western knowledge system. On the one hand, "digital right management" used to restrict access to personal information on social networking platforms is celebrated as a protection of privacy, while simultaneously when similar functions are used by cultural groups (i.e. indigenous communities) this is denounced as "access control" and reprehended as censorship.

Future perspectives 
Even though Western dominance seems to be prominent in research, some scholars, such as Simon Marginson, argue for "the need [for] a plural university world". Marginson argues that the East Asian Confucian model could take over the Western model.

This could be due to changes in funding for research both in the East and the West. Focused on emphasizing educational achievement, East Asian cultures, mainly in China and South Korea, have encouraged the increase of funding for research expansion. In contrast, in the Western academic world, notably in the United Kingdom as well as in some state governments in the United States, funding cuts for university research have occurred, which some  say may lead to the future decline of Western dominance in research.

Neo-colonial approaches

Professionalisation  

In several national and private academic systems, the professionalisation of research has resulted in formal job titles.

In Russia 
In present-day Russia, and some other countries of the former Soviet Union, the term researcher (nauchny sotrudnik) has been used both as a generic term for a person who has been carrying out scientific research, and as a job position within the frameworks of the Academy of Sciences, universities, and in other research-oriented establishments.

The following ranks are known:
 Junior Researcher (Junior Research Associate)
 Researcher (Research Associate)
 Senior Researcher (Senior Research Associate)
 Leading Researcher (Leading Research Associate)
 Chief Researcher (Chief Research Associate)

Publishing 

Academic publishing is a system that is necessary for academic scholars to peer review the work and make it available for a wider audience. The system varies widely by field and is also always changing, if often slowly. Most academic work is published in journal article or book form. There is also a large body of research that exists in either a thesis or dissertation form. These forms of research can be found in databases explicitly for theses and dissertations. In publishing, STM publishing is an abbreviation for academic publications in science, technology, and medicine.
Most established academic fields have their own scientific journals and other outlets for publication, though many academic journals are somewhat interdisciplinary, and publish work from several distinct fields or subfields. The kinds of publications that are accepted as contributions of knowledge or research vary greatly between fields, from the print to the electronic format. A study suggests that researchers should not give great consideration to findings that are not replicated frequently. It has also been suggested that all published studies should be subjected to some measure for assessing the validity or reliability of its procedures to prevent the publication of unproven findings. Business models are different in the electronic environment. Since about the early 1990s, licensing of electronic resources, particularly journals, has been very common. Presently, a major trend, particularly with respect to scholarly journals, is open access. There are two main forms of open access: open access publishing, in which the articles or the whole journal is freely available from the time of publication, and self-archiving, where the author makes a copy of their own work freely available on the web.

Research funding 

Most funding for scientific research comes from three major sources: corporate research and development departments; private foundations; and government research councils such as the National Institutes of Health in the USA and the Medical Research Council in the UK. These are managed primarily through universities and in some cases through military contractors. Many senior researchers (such as group leaders) spend a significant amount of their time applying for grants for research funds. These grants are necessary not only for researchers to carry out their research but also as a source of merit. The Social Psychology Network provides a comprehensive list of U.S. Government and private foundation funding sources.

See also 

 Advertising research
 European Charter for Researchers
 Funding bias
 Internet research
 Laboratory
 List of countries by research and development spending
 List of words ending in ology
 Market research
 Marketing research
 Open research
 Operations research
 Participatory action research
 Psychological research methods
 Research integrity
 Research-intensive cluster
 Research organization
 Research proposal
 Research university
 Scholarly research
 Secondary research
 Social research
 Society for Artistic Research
 Timeline of the history of the scientific method
 Undergraduate research

References

Further reading 
 
 
 Soeters, Joseph; Shields, Patricia and Rietjens, Sebastiaan. 2014. Handbook of Research Methods in Military Studies New York: Routledge.
 Talja, Sanna and Pamela J. Mckenzie (2007). Editor's Introduction: Special Issue on Discursive Approaches to Information Seeking in Context, The University of Chicago Press.

External links 

 
 
 

 
Methodology
Scientific method